Lynn Alice Jennings (born July 1, 1960) is a retired American long-distance runner. She is one of the best female American runners of all time, with a range from 1500 meters to the marathon. She excelled at all three of the sport's major disciplines: track, road, and cross country. She won the bronze in the Women's 10,000 metres at the 1992 Barcelona Olympics. She set a world indoor record in the 5000 meter run in 1990.

She is a nine-time champion of the USA Cross Country Championships and won the IAAF World Cross Country Championships three times consecutively from 1990 to 1992. Only two other women (Norway's Grete Waitz and Kenya's Edith Masai) have achieved this feat.

Career
Born in Princeton, New Jersey, Jennings attended the Bromfield school in Harvard, Massachusetts.  She ran on the boys' cross country team, as there was no girls' team at the time. Jennings won the U.S. National Cross Country Championship nine times. She ran the Boston Marathon unofficially in 1978 and finished in 2:46, a time which would have placed third in the open women's division and a record for her age group '.  Graduating in Harvard, MA, in 1978, she left behind countless records, including the national high school indoor 1500-meters run.

Jennings attended Princeton University and graduated with an A.B. in history in 1983 after completing a 93-page long senior thesis titled "The Harvard Shakers: A Study of the Rise and Decline of a Community."  Despite numerous college running titles, she left the university "unsatisified" with her performance.  She failed to qualify for the 1984 Olympics, but was the bronze medalist at 10,000 meters in the 1992 Summer Olympics, held in Barcelona, Spain.  Her time of 31:19.89 was a new American record, and it lasted until May 3, 2002, when it was broken by Deena Kastor in Palo Alto, California.

She won the World Cross Country Championships in 1990, 1991, and 1992.  The 1992 race was held at Franklin Park in Boston, on some of the same trails where she had won several Massachusetts state high school championships.  She won consecutive 3000 m medals at the IAAF World Indoor Championships, taking bronze in 1993 then silver in 1995. Outdoors she had fifth-place finishes over 10,000 metres in both the 1991 and 1993 World Championships. She was also a nine-time U.S. Outdoor champion.

In 1999, approaching age 39, she ran officially in the Boston Marathon in 2:38.

Jennings currently lives in Portland, Oregon.  She has become an accomplished masters rower (sculler), winning a gold medal in 2012 and bronze medal in 2011, in the women's grand master single scull event at the Head of the Charles Regatta, one of the most competitive and prestigious long-distance rowing races in the world.

Achievements

Circuit wins
 Tufts Health Plan 10K for Women: 1977, 1989–1993
 Cinque Mulini (XC): 1986, 1987
 Pittsburgh Great Race: 1986
 Freihofer's Run for Women: 1987, 1988, 1990, 1993–1996, 1998
 Charlotte Observer 10K: 1987, 1988, 1992
 Peachtree Road Race: 1987
 Gate River Run: 1988, 1996, 1997, 1999
 Falmouth Road Race: 1992
 Bay to Breakers: 1993
 Tulsa Run: 1993
 Crim Festival of Races: 1993
 Manchester Road Race: 1994
 Feaster Five Road Race: 1996, 1997

See also
 List of Princeton University Olympians

References

Further reading
 How Running Saved the Life of an Olympian: Lynn Jennings’ Story

External links
 USA Track and Field Hall of Fame page

1960 births
Living people
People from Princeton, New Jersey
Sportspeople from Mercer County, New Jersey
People from Harvard, Massachusetts
Sportspeople from Worcester County, Massachusetts
Track and field athletes from New Jersey
Track and field athletes from Massachusetts
American female middle-distance runners
American female long-distance runners
American female marathon runners
American female cross country runners
Olympic bronze medalists for the United States in track and field
Athletes (track and field) at the 1988 Summer Olympics
Athletes (track and field) at the 1992 Summer Olympics
Athletes (track and field) at the 1996 Summer Olympics
Medalists at the 1992 Summer Olympics
World Athletics Championships athletes for the United States
World Athletics Cross Country Championships winners
Goodwill Games medalists in athletics
Competitors at the 1990 Goodwill Games
21st-century American women